Rainbow's End is a 1995 Australian TV film directed by Denny Lawrence and starring Ernie Dingo. It is about a brother and sister who try to find their father.

References

External links

1995 television films
1995 films
Australian television films
1990s English-language films